The 2010 J. League Division 2 season was the 39th season of the second-tier club football in Japan and the 12th season since the establishment of J2 League.  The season began on March 6 and ended on December 4.

In this season, the number of participating clubs was increased by one, making the total number, nineteen.  As opposed to the last two seasons, clubs will play double-round robin, instead of triple-round robin.  At the end of the season, the top three clubs will be promoted to J. League Division 1 for the 2011 season. Furthermore, there will be no relegation to the third-tier Japan Football League.

Clubs

The following nineteen clubs will play in J. League Division 2 during the 2010 season. Of these clubs, JEF United Chiba, Kashiwa Reysol, and Oita Trinita were relegated from J1 League last year.  Also, Giravanz Kitakyushu (formerly known as New Wave Kitakyushu) newly joined from Japan Football League.

League format
Nineteen clubs will play in double round-robin (home and away) format, a total of 36 games each. A club receives 3 points for a win, 1 point for a tie, and 0 points for a loss. The clubs are ranked by points, and tie breakers are, in the following order:
 Goal differential
 Goals scored
 Head-to-head results
 Disciplinary points
A draw would be conducted, if necessary.  However, if two clubs are tied at the first place, both clubs will be declared as the champions. Three top clubs will be promoted to J1 (see below).
Changes from Previous Year
 Nineteen participating clubs, increased by one, Giravanz Kitakyushu, from last year
 Due to abolishment of triple round-robin format, which has been applied for the past two seasons, and installation of double round-robin, the number of games per club decreased to 36, down from 51, the fewest games played in J2, as same as 1999 J2 season. Therefore, regular season schedule had a month break after June 13 games during 2010 FIFA World Cup, first World Cup break as J2 since the 2002 events held in Japan, then the season resumed from July 17.
 As in J1, J2 teams may now have 7 substitute players per match, up from 5.

League table

Results

Top scorers

Notes:

Attendance

References 

J2 League seasons
2
Japan
Japan